Louis Johannes Fourie (born 28 January 1991) is a South African professional rugby union player that played provincial rugby for the  and Varsity Rugby for . His regular position is lock.

Career

Youth / Varsity Cup

In 2009, Fourie was included in Eastern Province's Under-18 Craven Week squad for the tournament held in East London. After finishing school, he enrolled at Port Elizabeth university Nelson Mandela Metropolitan University.

Fourie made seven appearances for the side in the 2011 Under-21 Provincial Championship, once again topping the log.

Eastern Province Kings

After four seasons in Varsity Rugby, Fourie was included in the  squad for the 2014 Vodacom Cup competition. That was his only involvement for the Eastern Province Kings, however, as he was not named in their squad for the 2014 Currie Cup Premier Division.

References

South African rugby union players
Living people
1991 births
Rugby union players from Bloemfontein
Rugby union locks
Eastern Province Elephants players